Jacques Grange, born in 1944, is a French interior designer.

Biography 
After completing his training at the École Boulle and the École Camondo, Grange made a career as a decorator in France and abroad from the 1970s. His main customers included Yves Saint Laurent and Pierre Bergé, for whom he decorated the Château Gabriel, in Benerville-sur-Mer, in the style of In Search of Lost Time. His usual customers include Isabelle Adjani, Princess Caroline of Monaco, Alain Ducasse, François Pinault, Robert Agostinelli, Valentino and Karl Lagerfeld. In New York City, he provided the decoration of Paloma Picasso's jewelry shop, of the Mark Hotel on Madison Avenue, and of the Barbizon Hotel.

His style is characterized by a harmony between traditional and contemporary tastes, with an assortment of styles that follows the line of Madeleine Castaing, who taught him the art of decoration.

In 1980, Grange acquired Colette's apartment, at the Palais-Royal in Paris. He rearranged it in order to make it his residence while respecting the spirit of the place.

Bibliography 
 Pierre Passebon, Jacques Grange, Éditions du Regard, 2008

See also
 François-Marie Banier

Footnotes

External links
 Les objets de Jacques Grange, Les Échos, March 23, 2007
 ELLE

1944 births
Living people
French interior designers